Wafula Wabuge (27 March 1927 – 28 November 1996) was a politician from Kenya.

Wabuge was a Member of Parliament for Kitale West Constituency (later Saboti Constituency).

He was a close ally of influential politician Masinde Muliro.

References 

1927 births
1996 deaths
Members of the National Assembly (Kenya)
20th-century Kenyan politicians